Lloyd George commonly refers to David Lloyd George (1863–1945), Prime Minister of the United Kingdom.

Lloyd George may also refer to:


People

As a compound surname
Earl Lloyd-George of Dwyfor, a title in the peerage of the United Kingdom
Frances Lloyd George (1888–1972), mistress, personal secretary, confidante and second wife of David Lloyd George
Gwilym Lloyd George (1894–1967), British politician and cabinet minister
Margaret Lloyd George (1864–1941) first wife of David Lloyd George
Megan Lloyd George (1902–1966), Welsh politician
Owen Lloyd George, 3rd Earl Lloyd-George of Dwyfor (1924–2010), British peer
Richard Lloyd George, 2nd Earl Lloyd-George of Dwyfor (1889–1968), British soldier and peer
William Lloyd George, 3rd Viscount Tenby (born 1927), British peer and former Army officer

As a given name and surname
Lloyd D. George (1930–2020), United States District Judge
Lloyd R. George (1925–2012), Arkansas politician

Other
Mount Lloyd George, British Columbia, Canada, named for David Lloyd George

See also
George Lloyd (disambiguation)